This article describes the religious, military and civil orders, decorations and medals of the Union of Myanmar.

Religious honorary orders 

Before and after Myanmar's independence, governments presented two religious orders, Abhidhaja Mahā Rattha Guru and Agga Maha Pandita, to distinguished Theravada Buddhist monks. In 1953, the government set up a committee of venerable monks and a committee of individuals to award. The group set four qualifications for the Abhidhaja Maha Rattha Guru order and five qualifications for Agga Maha Pandita order.

On 24 October 1991, the State Law and Order Restoration Council issued provision No. (42/91) and extended 20 religious orders. And provision No. (37/2010) enacted to confer the title of Tipitakadhara Dhammabhandagarika.

The above 23 degrees divided into seven categories were announced and presented annually on Independence Day. Although the original qualifications for religious orders were excellent, some of the qualifications for distinguished venerable monks and outstanding individuals were needed to be updated with the times. Due to such circumstances, the qualifications of each relevant religious order have been revised and amended by order No. (45/2015) dated 17 June 2015.

Modern-day military and civil honorary orders 
The State Peace and Development Council has enacted the provision No. 48/2009 dated 17 December 2009 to award honorary orders and medals to individuals who have made outstanding contributions to build nation. The following are the individuals who are eligible for honorary orders and medals:

 People who are working hard to build nation;
 Leaders, diplomats and individuals from foreign countries who are striving for friendly cooperation with the State;
 Peoples who have sacrificed their lives to protect national responsibilities and policy;
 Individuals who make significant efforts in line with community peace and rule of law, political, economic and social development for nation;
 People who can be world class creatives in the science, arts and other fields;
 Persons with excellent knowledge in literature and fine arts;

Types of honorary orders and medals 
There are three types of honorary orders and medals in the Union of Myanmar.

  Thingaha Orders, there are two groups; Thiri Thudhamma Thingaha and PyidaungSu Sithu Thingaha
  Medals, they are divided into Military Gallantry Medals and Outstanding Performance Medals
  Badges, they are divided into Military Gallantry Badges and Outstanding Performance Badges

Thingaha orders 
There are two groups for awarding individuals who have done great work for the country.

1. Thiri Thudhamma Thingaha 
  Agga Maha Thiri Thudhamma 
  Sadoe Maha Thiri Thudhamma 
  Mahar Thiri Thudhamma

2. PyidaungSu Sithu Thingaha 
 Agga Maha Thray Sithu 
 Sadoe Maha Thray Sithu 
 Maha Thray Sithu 
 Thray Sithu 
 Sithu

Medals 
Military Distinguished Gallantry Medals are as follows:

 AungSan Thuriya Medal
 Thiha Thura Medal
 Thura Medal

Outstanding Performance Medals are as follows:

 Thiri Pyanchi Medal
 Zayya Kyawhtin Medal
 Wunna Kyawhtin Medal
 Alinkar Kyawswa Medal
 Theikpa Kyawswa Medal

Badges

1. Military Gallantry and Outstanding Performance Badges

1.1 Military Gallantry Badges 
 AungSan Bagde
 ThihaBala Bagde
 Hero Record Badge

1.2. Military Outstanding Performance Badges 
 Myanmar Military Service ThinGaHa Badge
 Outstanding Military Service Badge
 Pyithu TharKaung Badge
 State Military Service Badge
 Thwarting Foreign Enemy Badge
 People's Militia Combat Badge

2. Myanmar Police Force Gallantry and Outstanding Performance Badges

2.1 Myanmar Police Force Gallantry Badges 
 Ye Thiha Bagde
 Ye Thura Bagde
 Ye Bala Badge

2.2. Myanmar Police Force Outstanding Performance Badges 
 Ye Thurein Badge
 Ye Kyawswa Badge
 Ye Kyawthu Badge
 Outstanding Police Service Badge
 State Police Service Badge
 Myanmar Police Force Joint Combat Badge

3. Public Service Outstanding Performance Badges 
 Outstanding Public Service Badge
 Public Service Badge
 Rule of Law and Order Badge
 Peace and Development Badge

On December 10, 2012, provision amendment added new categories of medals in the Medals for Outstanding Performance. They were:

 Excellent Performance in Arts (First, Second and Third Classes)
 Excellent Performance in Science (First, Second and Third Classes)
 Excellent Performance in Medical Field (First, Second and Third Classes)
 Excellent Performance in Technology (First, Second and Third Classes)

On December 5, 2014, the President of Union of Republic of Myanmar issued the order No.74/2014 to create and add new categories of the Medals for Outstanding Performance in Administrative, Social, Economy and Subjects fields. They were:

 Excellent Performance in Administrative Field (First, Second and Third Classes)
 Excellent Performance in Social Field (First, Second and Third Classes)
 Excellent Performance in Agricultural Economy Field (First, Second and Third Classes)
 Excellent Performance in Industrial Economy Field (First, Second and Third Classes)
 Excellent Performance in Commerce Economy Field (First, Second and Third Classes)
 Excellent Performance in Service Economy Field (First, Second and Third Classes)
 Excellent Performance in Science (First, Second and Third Classes)
 Excellent Performance in Arts (First, Second and Third Classes)
 Excellent Performance in Medical Field (First, Second and Third Classes)
 Excellent Performance in Technology (First, Second and Third Classes)
 Excellent Performance in Fine Arts (First, Second and Third Classes)
 Excellent Performance in Literary (First, Second and Third Classes)

Detail and description of medals

Independence Mawgunwin Title (First, Second and Third Classes) 

This award was for participation in both military and civil struggles of Burma's independence. This award is granted for service in three different periods:

 8 January to 26 July 1942
 27 July 1942 to 26 March 1945
 27 March to 15 August 1945

Participants in all three periods were awarded the First Class, participants in only two periods received the second class and participants in only in one period were awarded the third class. The provision of this award can be passed down to direct heirs of the original participant and to be worn, multi-generationally, in this fashion similar to the awards bestowed by the ancient Myanmar kings to their loyal subjects. It was established in 1953 and the last Independence Mawgunwin Title (First, Second and Third Classes) was awarded on 24 November 1986.

Aung San Thuriya Medal 
Instituted in 1948, the Aung San Thuriya (အောင်ဆန်းသူရိယဘွဲ့) medal is the highest recognition for valour and gallantry "in the face of the enemy" that can be awarded to members of the Myanmar Armed Forces of any ranks in any services. This is the highest military award in Myanmar and it is equivalent to British Victoria Cross and German Knight Cross of the Iron Cross.

The decoration is a one and half inch (3.8 cm) stainless steel stylized sun of sixteen rays. Suspended by an integral straight bar suspender. The name of the recipient name and year of award is engraved on the reverse and the sun was held by two ribbons.

To this day, there have only been six Aung San Thuriya medals has been awarded and only one of the recipients is civilian. The recipients are:

Thiha Thura Medal 
The decoration is a bronze stylized Burmese lion, with the name of the decoration written in Burmese "Thiha Thura" (သီဟသူရ) on the scroll below. The ribbon is 1.25 inches (32 mm), bright red with yellow edges or red with dark green centre stripes.

A total of 47 Thiha Thura Medals has been awarded between 1949 and 2018 January.

Thura Medal 
A gold depiction of a stylized rising sun with the central sun in red enamel. The ribbon is 32 mm, bright red with yellow edges and a yellow center stripe.

To date, a total of 547 Thura medals has been awarded. The only woman to be awarded the medal is Ma Chit Po.

History 
In the Parliamentary Democracy Period after regaining independence in 1948, the honorary titles and honorary medals in conformity with the independent and sovereign country were created to confer them on the outstanding persons. From 1948 to 1978, the honorary titles and honorary medals conferred on the outstanding persons were as follows:

 Independence Mawgunwin Title (First, Second and Third Classes)
 Thingaha Honorary Title
 Thudhamma Thingaha (Most Glorious Order of Truth)
 Agga Maha Thirithudhamma Title
 Thadoe Thirithudhamma Title
 Maha Thirithudhamma Title
 Pyidaungsu Sithu Thingaha (Order of the Union of Burma)
 Agga Maha Tharaysithu Title
 Thadoe Maha Tharaysithu Title
 Maha Tharaysithu Title
 Tharaysithu Title
 Sithu Title
 Honorary Title for Gallantry (It had not been awarded)
 Honorary Titles for Outstanding Performance
 Thiri Pyanchi Title
 Wunna Kyawhtin Title
 Alinka Kyawswa Title
 Theikpa Kyawswa Title
 Zeya Kyawhtin Title
 Medals for Gallantry
 Aung San Thuriya
 Thiha Thura
 Thura
 Aung San Medal
 Thiha Bala Medal
 Gallantry Medal
 Pyidaungsu Gold Medal
 Pyidaungsu Silver Medal
 Good Military Service Medal
 State Good Military Service Medal
 Good Police Service Medal (first and second classes)
 Medals for Outstanding Performances (It had not been awarded)

In 1978, the Burma Socialist Programme Party issued new provisions on honorary titles and honorary medals in conformity with the Socialist System to amend the honorary titles and honorary medals awarded in the Parliamentary Democracy Period. According to new provision, the titles and medals were conferred on those who forged the Socialism, on those who made the utmost efforts for the improvement of the socialist economic system, and on those who made the ultimate sacrifice in safeguarding the nation. The honorary titles and medals awarded from 1978 to 1988 were as follows:

 Independence Mawgunwin Medal (First, Second and Third Classes)

 Honorary Title
 Tagun Group
 Aung San Tagun Title
 Pyidaungsu Tagun Title
 Tagun Title
 Zarni Group
 Lanzin Zarni Title
 Pyidaungsu Zarni Title
 Zarni Title
 Naingngan Gonyi Title (First and Second Classes) (no permission to use it as prefix or suffix to the name of the winner)
 Honorary Titles for Gallantry
 Aung San Thuriya Title
 Thiha Thura Title
 Thura Title
 Honorary Titles for Outstanding Performance (It had not been awarded)
 Medals for Gallantry
 Aung San Medal
 Thiha Bala Medal
 Gallantry Medal
 Ye Thiha Medal
 Ye Thura Medal
 Ye Bala Medal
 Medals for Outstanding Performance
 All-round Excellent Performance in Socialist Economy
 Excellent Performance in Agricultural Field (First, Second and Third Classes)
 Excellent Performance in Industrial Field (First, Second and Third Classes)
 All-round Excellent Performance in Socialist Democracy
 Excellent Performance in Administrative Field (First, Second and Third Classes)
 Excellent Performance in Social Field (First, Second and Third Classes)
 Ayaydawpon Medal
 Independence Organizing Medal
 Medal of Freedom
 Good Military Service Medal
 Good Public Medal
 Medal for those who made sacrifices
 State Military Service Medal
 Medal for Combating Foreign Enemy
 People's Militia Combat Medal
 Ye Thurein Medal
 Ye Kyawswa Medal
 Ye Kyawthu Medal
 Good Police Service Medal
 State Police Service Medal
 Police Joint Combat Medal
 Public Good Service Medal
 Public Service Medal
 Rule of Law and Order Medal

The honorary titles and medals awarded from 1988 to 2009 were the same as those awarded from 1978 to 1988. There were no changes in honorary titles and medals, and most were awarded in accordance with the system practiced during the period of Burma Socialist Programme Party.

References

External links